Rawe Peak is a summit in the U.S. state of Nevada.

Rawe Peak was named after R. S. Rawe, a Sutro Tunnel Company official.

References

Mountains of Lyon County, Nevada